Helaine Olen is an American journalist and author based in New York. She is a columnist for The Washington Post and, before that, Slate, where she wrote the column The Bills. She is the author or co-author of three books:  Office Mate (2007), Pound Foolish (2012), and The Index Card (2016).

Biography
Olen was born in the mid-1960s, and is Jewish. She graduated from Smith College with a BA in English, and earned an MA in journalism at the University of Minnesota.  

She is a columnist for The Washington Post and, before that, Slate, where she wrote the column The Bills.

Olen is a contributor to Post Opinions. Her work has appeared in Slate, the Nation, the New York Times, The Wall Street Journal, The Washington Post, Salon, Reuters, Rolling Stone, and the Atlantic. She was a lead writer and editor for The Los Angeles Times’ “Money Makeover” series.  She has also appeared on "Frontline," the BBC, NPR, C-Span, MSNBC, "All Things Considered", and "The Daily Show." 

Olen is the author or co-author of three books:  Office Mate (2007), Pound Foolish (2012), and The Index Card (2016).  

She serves on the advisory board of the Economic Hardship Reporting Project. 

Olen is critical of the personal finance industry's typical advice to consumers, suggesting that it leaves them unprepared for major downturns such as market crashes, layoffs, and medical bills.

Honors and awards
Society of American Business Editors and Writers, Best in Business awards, Honorable Mention for Commentary, 2017; 
Society of American Business Editors and Writers, Best in Business awards, Personal Finance, 2016; 
National Women’s Political Caucus, Exceptional Merit in Media Award, 2013
named one of Business Insider's "50 Women Who Are Changing the World"
named one of the "Top 30 Most Influential People in Personal Finance and Wealth" by MoneyTips.

Personal life

Olen is married to the script writer Matt Roshkow and has two sons; the family lives in New York City.

Selected works

References

External links 
 Personal website
 

Living people
Jewish American non-fiction writers
American women journalists
American women non-fiction writers
Jewish advice columnists
Jewish American journalists
Los Angeles Times people
Slate (magazine) people
Smith College alumni
University of Minnesota alumni
Year of birth missing (living people)
21st-century American journalists
21st-century American non-fiction writers
21st-century American women writers
The Washington Post journalists